The 1982 Nehru Cup was the first edition of the Nehru Cup. It was held between 16 February to 3 March in Calcutta.

Format
A total of 6 teams participated in the tournament through being invited by the All India Football Federation. The tournament would be played in a round-robin style with the top two in the final standings then meeting in a final match to crown the champions.

Amateur teams and 'B' sides from Europe were invited.

Matches

Final

Winners

External links
 Details at rsssf.com
 中国国家男子足球队比赛（1982）

1982
1982 in Indian sport
1982 in Uruguayan football
1982 in Chinese football
1982 in South Korean football
1981–82 in Italian football
1981–82 in Yugoslav football
1981–82 in Indian football
1982 in Asian football